Edward D. Eyestone (born June 15, 1961) is a two-time Olympic marathoner, long distance runner, and an NCAA coach.

Running career

High school 
Eyestone graduated from Bonneville High School in Washington Terrace, Utah and was the Utah State High School State Champion in cross-country and track and field.

Collegiate 
Eyestone attended Brigham Young University (BYU) earning a Bachelor of Arts (B.A.) in psychology and a Master of Science (M.S.) in exercise science. While at BYU, he became a 10-time NCAA All-American and in 1984 went undefeated in NCAA cross-country events. Eyestone is one of only four runners, along with Gerry Lindgren, Edward Cheserek, and Suleiman Nyambui, to capture the NCAA "Triple Crown" by becoming the 1985 NCAA Champion in cross-country, 5,000 meters and 10,000 meters. In 1985, the Academic All-American and recipient of the NCAA Top Six Award set a then-NCAA record in the 10,000 meters with a time of 27:41:05. As of 2018, it was still the third-fastest official 10,000 meter time in NCAA history. He finished his collegiate career with four NCAA Championships.

In 1986, Eyestone won the San Francisco Bay to Breakers 12 km race, defeating an estimated 110,000 competitors in what the Guinness Book of Records considers the world's largest footrace.  He remains the last American to have won this race, and the only American to have done so since 1981.

International racing career

IAAF World Cross Country Championships 

 1980 Junior Men's Individual Race - Bronze Medal
 1983 Men's Team Event: USA - Silver Medal
 1984 Men's Team Event: USA - Silver Medal
 1985 Men's Team Event: USA - Bronze Medal
 1986 Men's Team Event: USA - Bronze Medal

Olympic and International Distance Races 
 Olympic Marathon 1988 Seoul, Korea (29th place, 2:19:09)
 Olympic Marathon 1992 Barcelona, Spain (13th place, 2:15:23)
 Personal Best Marathon: 2:10:59
 Personal Best 10,000 Meters 27:40
 Ranked in the “Top Ten” of US  Marathoners, for nine years.
 Ranked in the “Top Ten” of US 10,000 Meters for eight years.
 Five Time US Road Racer of the Year.
 1st place, Gate River Run 15K (Jacksonville, FL), (1990)
 1st place, Bellin 10K Run (Green Bay, Wisc.), (1991, 1992, 1993, 1994, 1995)
 1st place, Bay to Breakers, (San Francisco, Ca.) (1986)
 1st place, Peachtree Road Race 10K (Atlanta, Ga.) (1991)
 1st place, The Medical Center 10K Classic (Bowling Green, Ky.) (1990)
 1st place, Twin Cities Marathon in Minneapolis-St. Paul, Minnesota (2:14:34) (1993) 
 21st place, World Championships in Athletics - Men's Marathon (1995)

Post-racing career 
After putting up his shoes, Eyestone has become a noted distance and road racing expert, serving as a columnist for Runner's World magazine and television commentor for ESPN's "Race of the Month" series. Eyestone served as an analyst for NBC Sports coverage of Track and Field and Race Walking at the 2008 Summer Olympics.

Coaching career 
Eyestone returned to BYU as both head coach of the cross-country team and men's track assistant coach in 2000 and was later promoted to head track coach in 2013.  Coach Eyestone is a three-time selection as "Coach of the Year" for the Mountain West Conference (MWC). Previously he served as assistant track coach at Weber State University (1996–98).

Coach Eyestone was named head coach of Team USA at the 2017 IAAF World Cross Country Championships in Kampala, Uganda.

On November 23, 2019, the BYU men's cross-country team (coached by Eyestone) won the NCAA D1 Championship race in Terre Haute, Indiana. Eyestone also became the first male to have both won an individual NCAA D1 Cross Country title and coach a Division 1 team to a national title.  Eyestone was subsequently named the "Men's National Coach of the Year" (2019) by the U.S. Track & Field and Cross Country Coaches Association.  Eyestone was also named the State of Utah's Governor's State of Sport Award for Collegiate "Coach of the Year" (2020).

References

1961 births
Living people
People from Weber County, Utah
Track and field athletes from Utah
American male long-distance runners
American male marathon runners
Olympic male marathon runners
Olympic track and field athletes of the United States
Athletes (track and field) at the 1988 Summer Olympics
Athletes (track and field) at the 1992 Summer Olympics
BYU Cougars men's track and field athletes
BYU Cougars track and field coaches
BYU Cougars cross country coaches
BYU Cougars men's cross country runners
Weber State Wildcats coaches